Louis "The Fox" Taglianetti (1903-February 6, 1970) was a Rhode Island organized crime figure murdered by shotgun in front of his apartment building, the King Philip Arms, on Broad Street, Cranston, Rhode Island. A resident of the apartment complex and possible companion to Taglianetti, Elizabeth McKenna (age 26)  was also murdered. Taglianetti had a previous 1967 conviction for income tax evasion and was an under indictment for the 1962 murder of underworld enforcer of John Jack Nazarian who was shot and killed on a Providence, Rhode Island street.

References

1903 births
1970 deaths
People from Cranston, Rhode Island
People murdered by American organized crime
People murdered in Rhode Island
Deaths by firearm in Rhode Island
American gangsters of Italian descent
American people convicted of tax crimes